1931 was the 38th season of County Championship cricket in England. New Zealand played their first Test series in England, the hosts winning 1–0. Yorkshire won the championship.

Honours
County Championship – Yorkshire
Minor Counties Championship – Leicestershire II
Wisden – Bill Bowes, Charles Dempster, James Langridge, Nawab of Pataudi, senior, Hedley Verity

Test series

New Zealand tour

England defeated the first New Zealand tourists 1–0 with two matches drawn.

County Championship

Leading batsmen
Herbert Sutcliffe topped the averages with 3006 runs @ 96.96

Leading bowlers
Harold Larwood topped the averages with 129 wickets @ 12.03

References

Annual reviews
 Wisden Cricketers' Almanack 1932

External links
 CricketArchive – season summary

1931 in English cricket
English cricket seasons in the 20th century